Isabel Pfeiffer-Poensgen (born 25 April 1954, in Aachen) is a German politician, lawyer and administrative officer. who served as State Minister of Culture and Science in the governments of Minister-Presidents Armin Laschet and Hendrik Wüst of North Rhine-Westphalia from 2017 to 2022.

Career
From 1989 until 1999, Pfeiffer-Poensgen was the chancellor of the Cologne College of Music.

From 2004 until 2017, Pfeiffer-Poensgen served as Secretary General of the Cultural Foundation of the German Federal States (KdL).

Following the 2017 state elections in North Rhine-Westphalia, Pfeiffer-Poensgen was appointed State Minister of Culture and Science in the government of Minister-President Armin Laschet. As one of the state's representatives at the Bundesrat, she has been a member of the Committee on Cultural Affairs since 2017. In addition, she is also a member of the German-French Friendship Group set up by the German Bundesrat and the French Senate.

Other activities (selection)

Corporate boards
 NRW.BANK, Member of the Supervisory Board (2017-2018)

Non-profit organizations
 Zollverein Coal Mine Industrial Complex, Member of the Board of Trustees (2018–2022)
 Deutschlandradio, Ex-Officio Member of the Supervisory Board (2017–2022)
 Josefine and Eduard von Portheim Foundation for Science and Art, Member of the Board of Trustees (since 2018)
 Düsseldorfer Schauspielhaus, Chairwoman of the Supervisory Board (since 2017)
 Heinrich Hertz Foundation, Member of the Board of Trustees (2017–2022)
 Helmholtz Association of German Research Centres, Ex-Officio Member of the Senate
 Kunststiftung NRW, Member of the Board of Trustees (2017–2022)
 Museum Insel Hombroich, Member of the Board of Trustees (2017–2022)
 North Rhine-Westphalian Academy of Sciences, Humanities and the Arts, Vice Chair of the Board of Trustees (2017–2022)
 Prussian Cultural Heritage Foundation (SPK), Deputy Chair of the Board
 Akademie Schloss Solitude, Member of the Board of Trustees
 Peter and Irene Ludwig Foundation, Chairwoman of the Board of Trustees
 German Lost Art Foundation, Chairwoman of the Board of Trustees (2015-2017)
 Franco-German Cultural Council (DFKR), Member of the Board of Trustees (2010-2017)

References

1954 births
Living people
Jurists from North Rhine-Westphalia
People from Aachen